The 1st Combat Helicopter Regiment (1er Régiment d'Hélicoptères de Combat) (1er RHC) is based at Quartier La Horie (Phalsbourg).

History

The 1st Combat Helicopter Regiment was created on 1 August 1977, but traces its origins back to the 1950s. It carries the traditions of the 1st then the 21st Artillery Observation Groups which achieved particular fame during the First Indochina War, winning six citations. The 1st Aerial Artillery Observation Group was established on 20 November 1945, and became the 21st Aerial Artillery Observation Group on 1 October 1950. From 1945 to February 1946 it was stationed at Camp de Valdahon. It was dissolved on 31 December 1953.

That heritage is recalled by the inscription "Indochina 1946–1954" carried on the standard which was solemnly presented to the regiment on 27 June 1980. Camp de la Horie at Phalsbourg where the regiment is stationed was built on the basis of the former Phalsbourg-Bourscheid Air Base, vacated in the 1960s by the United States Air Force. The base was constructed by French workers for the Americans in 1953. Cited in an army order, the régiment received the Croix de guerre des Théâtres d'opérations extérieures with palm on 11 July 1991. It has been awarded battle honours for Kuwait.

In 1990 the 1st RHC took part in Opération Daguet (Operation Brocket) in Iraq. It has also seen service in Chad, in Djibouti, in Somalia, in the former Yugoslavia, in Kosovo, in Timor, in Ivory Coast and in Afghanistan.

Organization

The regiment is divided into 3 battalions:

 The airmobile support battalion with
 1 aerodrome services squadron;
 1 command and logistics squadron;
 1 defense and protection squadron of reservists.
 The reconnaissance and attack helicopter battalion with:
 1 squadron of reconnaissance and attack helicopters using Aérospatiale Gazelle Vivianes
 2 attack destruction squadrons using Eurocopter Tigre HADs
 1 Tigre/Gazelle helicopter maintenance squadron.
The maneuver and assault helicopter battalion with:
 2 squadrons of maneuver and assault helicopters using NHIndustries NH90 TTH Caïmans;
 1 squadron of maneuver and assault helicopters using Aérospatiale SA 330 Pumas
 1 Caïman/Puma helicopter maintenance squadron.

Commanding officers

Notes

References

External links
 

Regiments of French Army Light Aviation
Military units and formations established in 1977